Marlon Javier Ganchozo Santana (born February 21, 1991) is an Ecuadorian football defender who plays for Patria.

Club career
Marlon Ganchozo began his career at the Alfaro Moreno Academia in Guayaquil. In 2009, he joined the youth ranks of LDU Quito and appeared in 24 matches for the Under-18 side. His play with the Under-18 side did not go unnoticed by manager Edgardo Bauza and Ganchozo was promoted to the senior side in 2010.

Ganchozo quickly gained the trust of Bauza and earned a starting spot for the club. On April 4, 2010 in a league match played at Estadio Casa Blanca against longtime rival Barcelona which ended in a 0–0 draw, Ganchozo suffered a serious leg injury that sidelined him for two months. Upon recovering from his injury Ganchozo regained the form that made him one of the most promising players in Ecuadorean football. He scored his first goal for Liga on July 22, 2010 in the rematch against Barcelona helping his side to a 2–1 victory. After helping LDU Quito win the Second Stage of the 2010 Serie A, Ganchozo started both legs of the finals against Emelec helping his club to a 2–1 aggregate victory which proclaimed LDU Quito as national champion for the 10th time in its history.

Honors
LDU Quito
Serie A: 2010

References

External links
FEF card 

1991 births
Living people
People from Vinces Canton
Association football defenders
Ecuadorian footballers
L.D.U. Quito footballers
L.D.U. Portoviejo footballers
S.D. Quito footballers
Mushuc Runa S.C. footballers
Ecuadorian Serie A players